The Phantom Stagecoach is a 1957 American Western film directed by Ray Nazarro and starring William Bishop, Kathleen Crowley, Richard Webb, Hugh Sanders, John Doucette, and Frank Ferguson. The film was released by Columbia Pictures on April 1, 1957.

Plot

Cast
William Bishop as Glen Hayden
Kathleen Crowley as Fran Maroon
Richard Webb as Tom Bradley
Hugh Sanders as Martin Maroon
John Doucette as Harry Farrow
Frank Ferguson as Joe Patterson
Ray Teal as Sheriff Ned Riorden
Percy Helton as Mr. Wiggins
Maudie Prickett as Mrs. Wiggins
Leah Baird as Mrs. Simms (uncredited)
Lane Bradford as Langton (uncredited)
Byron Foulger as Mr. Fenshaw (uncredited)
Coleman Francis as Townsman (uncredited)
Frank Hagney as Rider (uncredited)
Kermit Maynard as Henchman (uncredited)
Dennis Moore as Townsman (uncredited)
Emil Sitka as Johnson (uncredited)
Al Thompson as Murphy (uncredited)
Eddy Waller as Sam Clayton (uncredited)
Blackie Whiteford as Townsman (uncredited)
Robert B. Williams as Charlie Wagner (uncredited)

References

External links

1957 Western (genre) films
American Western (genre) films
1957 films
American black-and-white films
Columbia Pictures films
1950s English-language films
Films directed by Ray Nazarro
1950s American films